Keith B. Griffin (born October 26, 1961) is a former American football running back in the National Football League for the Washington Redskins.  He played college football at the University of Miami.  Griffin was featured on the cover of Sports Illustrated on January 9, 1984, for the story of the Hurricanes' dramatic victory over the #1 ranked Nebraska Cornhuskers 31–30 in the January 1, 1984, Orange Bowl.  The 11–1–0 Hurricanes broke the Cornhuskers' 22-game win streak.  Keith is the younger brother to two-time Heisman Trophy winner Archie Griffin.

References

1961 births
Living people
Players of American football from Columbus, Ohio
American football running backs
Miami Hurricanes football players
Washington Redskins players